Jimmie Keeling (born August 10, 1935) is a former American football coach.  He served as the head football coach at Hardin–Simmons University in Abilene, Texas from 1990 to 2010.  After a highly successful coaching career in Texas high school football, Keeling was chosen to revive the Hardin–Simmons Cowboys football program, which hadn't played a football game since 1963. Keeling became the winningest coach in Hardin–Simmons football history in 1997, surpassing Warren B. Woodson.

Keeling graduated from Evant High School in 1953. He started his collegiate career at Tarleton State University, then a junior college, and finished his undergraduate work at Howard Payne University in 1958. Jimmie Keeling's first coaching job was as assistant football coach at Hico High School, Hico, Texas, from September 1956 to June 1957. His first head coaching job came soon after, taking the reins as head coach and athletic director at Dublin in 1959.

Keeling had several stops in his early coaching career, namely at Tulia, Elgin, Lubbock Estacado, Andrews and Lamar Consolidated. His 1968 Lubbock Estacado squad went 14–0 and claimed the Class 3A state championship, beating Refugio High School, 14–0. He also guided Lamar Consolidated to a regional championship in 1978.

In 1979 he overtook a storied football program at San Angelo Central, and remained there for 10 seasons. He guided the Bobcats all the way to the Class 5A regional championships in 1982 and in 1988, reached the state quarterfinals. Keeling's last high school stop was at John Tyler High School in Tyler, Texas for one year.

Hardin-Simmons chose Keeling to revive their football program in 1990, after a 37-year absence.  Keeling's Hardin-Simmons Cowboys had 19 consecutive winning seasons. His teams won 10 conference titles and played in 19 playoff games, and Keeling was named conference coach of the year six times.

In 1995, Keeling was rewarded for his 30 years of excellence in high-school coaching when he was inducted into the Texas High School Coaches Association Hall of Honor. Keeling posted a career high school record of 182–125–12.

Head coaching record

College

References

1935 births
Living people
Hardin–Simmons Cowboys football coaches
High school football coaches in Texas
Howard Payne University alumni
People from San Angelo, Texas